The Stockdale Baronetcy, of Hoddington in the County of Southampton, is a title in the Baronetage of the United Kingdom. It was created on 5 December 1960 for Edmund Stockdale, Lord Mayor of London from 1959 to 1960.  the title is held by his grandson, the third Baronet, who succeeded in that year.

Stockdale baronets, of Hoddington (1960)
Sir Edmund Villiers Minshull Stockdale, 1st Baronet (1903–1989)
Sir Thomas Minshull Stockdale, 2nd Baronet (1940–2021) married (1965) Jacqueline Ha Van Vuong: their daughter is the fashion writer and stylist Charlotte Stockdale.  
Sir John Minshull Stockdale, 3rd Baronet (born 1967)

The heir apparent is the current holder's son, Johnnie Minshull Stockdale (born 2008)

Arms

Notes

References
Kidd, Charles, Williamson, David (editors). Debrett's Peerage and Baronetage (1990 edition). New York: St Martin's Press, 1990, 

Stockdale